Melvin Joseph Queen (March 4, 1918 – April 4, 1982) was a pitcher in Major League Baseball. From 1942 through 1952, he played for the New York Yankees and Pittsburgh Pirates. Born in Maxwell, Pennsylvania, he batted and threw right-handed.

In an eight-season career, Queen posted a 27–40 record with 328 strikeouts and a 5.09 ERA in 556 innings pitched. His best season was in 1951 when he led the National League pitchers with a 6.58 SO/9 (123 SO in 168 IP).

On August 27, 1951, Queen became a notable footnote in baseball history when he was thrown out by two feet at first base by strong-armed Brooklyn Dodger outfielder Carl Furillo after Queen had apparently singled into right field.

His son, Melvin Douglas Queen, was an MLB outfielder-turned-pitcher who played with the Reds and Angels and also coached and managed for the Toronto Blue Jays.

Queen died in Fort Smith, Arkansas, at the age of 64.

See also
List of second-generation Major League Baseball players

References

External links

1918 births
1982 deaths
Akron Yankees players
Amsterdam Rugmakers players
Augusta Tigers players
Baseball players from Pennsylvania
Binghamton Triplets players
Butler Yankees players
Cincinnati Reds scouts
Dover Orioles players
Hollywood Stars players
Indianapolis Indians players
Kansas City Blues (baseball) players
Major League Baseball pitchers
New York Yankees players
Newark Bears (IL) players
People from Brooke County, West Virginia
Pittsburgh Pirates players